Nina Bawden CBE, FRSL, JP (19 January 1925 – 22 August 2012) was an English novelist and children's writer. She was shortlisted for the Booker Prize in 1987 and the Lost Man Booker Prize in 2010. She is one of very few who have both served as a Booker judge and made a Booker shortlist as an author. She was a recipient of the Golden PEN Award.

Biography
Nina Bawden was born in 1925 in Ilford, Essex, England as Nina Mary Mabey. She lived in Ilford in "a rather nasty housing estate that [her] mother despised". Her mother was a teacher and her father a member of the Royal Marines. She was evacuated during World War II to Aberdare, Wales, at the age of fourteen. She spent school holidays at a farm in Shropshire with her mother and brothers.

She attended Ilford County High School for Girls; Somerville College (B.A. 1946, M.A. 1951), Oxford, where she gained a degree in Philosophy, Politics and Economics.

From 1946 to 1954 Bawden was married to Harry Bawden. They had two sons, Nicholas (who took his own life in 1981) and Robert. In 1954 she married Austen Kark, a reporter who eventually became managing director of the BBC World Service. They had a daughter, Perdita, who died in March 2012. She also had two stepdaughters: Cathy, who lives in New Zealand, and Teresa, who lives in London.
In 2002 Bawden was badly injured in the Potters Bar rail crash, in which her husband Austen Kark was killed. Her testimony about the crash, and her exploration of the management and maintenance mistakes that caused it, became a major part of David Hare's play The Permanent Way, in which she appeared as a character.

Bawden died at her home in north London on 22 August 2012.

Literary career
Some of Bawden's 55 books have been dramatised by BBC Children's television. Many have been published in translation.

Her novels include On the Run (1964), The Witch's Daughter (1966), The Birds on the Trees (1970), Carrie's War (1973), and The Peppermint Pig (1975). For the latter she won the 1976 Guardian Children's Fiction Prize, a once-in-a-lifetime book award judged by a panel of British children's writers. Carrie's War won the 1993 Phoenix Award from the Children's Literature Association as the best English-language children's book that did not win a major contemporary award when it was originally published twenty years earlier. It is named for the mythical bird phoenix, which is reborn from its ashes, to suggest the book's rise from obscurity. (Bawden and Carrie's War had been a commended runner up for the Carnegie Medal from the Library Association, recognising the year's best children's book by a British subject.)

In 2010, Bawden and The Birds on the Trees made the shortlist for the Lost Man Booker Prize. Forty years earlier, the Booker-McConnell Prize for the year's best British novel had skipped 1970 publications. Bawden and Shirley Hazzard were the only living nominees out of the six shortlisted; the award went to J. G. Farrell for Troubles. In 2004, she was awarded the Golden PEN Award by English PEN for "a Lifetime's Distinguished Service to Literature".

Runner up for other awards
1987 Shortlisted for the Booker Prize – Circles of Deceit
1995 Shortlisted for the WH Smith Mind-Boggling Book Award – The Real Plato Jones
1996 Shortlisted for the Carnegie Medal – Granny the Pag

Works

Who Calls the Tune? (1953)
The Old Flamingo (1954)
Change Here for Babylon (1955)
The Solitary Child (1956)
Devil by the Sea (1957)
Just Like a Lady (1960)
In Honour Bound (1961)
The Secret Passage (1963)
Tortoise by Candlelight (1963)
The House of Secrets (1963)
On the Run (1964); US title, Three on the Run
Under the Skin (1964)
A Little Love, A Little Learning (1965)
The White Horse Gang (1966)
The Witch's Daughter (1966)
A Handful of Thieves (1967)
A Woman of My Age (1967)
The Grain of Truth (1969)
The Runaway Summer (1969)
The Birds on the Trees (1970)
Squib (1971)
Anna Apparent (1972)
Carrie's War (1973) — winner of the 1993 Phoenix Award
George Beneath a Paper Moon (1974)
The Peppermint Pig (1975) — winner of the 1976 Guardian Prize
Afternoon of a Good Woman (1976)
Solitary Child (1976)
Rebel on a Rock (1978)
Familiar Passions (1979)
The Robbers (1979)
Walking Naked (1981)
William Tell (1981), a picture book
Kept in the Dark (1982)
The Ice House (1983)
Saint Francis of Assisi (1983), a picture book
The Finding (1985)
On the Edge (1985)
Princess Alice (1986)
Circles of Deceit (1987)
Henry (1988)
Keeping Henry (1988)
The Outside Child (1989)
Family Money (1991)
Humbug (1992)
The Real Plato Jones (1993)
In My Own Time: Almost an Autobiography (1994)
Granny the Pag (1995)
A Nice Change (1997)
Off the Road (1998)
The Ruffian on the Stair (2001)
Dear Austen (2005)

See also
 
List of winners and shortlisted authors of the Booker Prize for Fiction

Notes

References

External links

1925 births
2012 deaths
Alumni of Somerville College, Oxford
Commanders of the Order of the British Empire
English children's writers
English women novelists
Fellows of the Royal Society of Literature
Guardian Children's Fiction Prize winners
British women children's writers
20th-century English novelists
21st-century English novelists
20th-century English women writers
21st-century English women writers